Lockdown is a 2021 Nigerian psychological thriller film written and directed by Moses Inwang. The film stars Omotola Jalade-Ekeinde, Tony Umez and Charles Awurum in the lead roles. The film was produced by the collaboration among studios Sneeze Films, FilmOne, iFactory Films and CEM Media Group. The film is based on Nigerian medical doctor Ameyo Adadevoh who was credited with having curbed a wider spread of the Ebola virus in Nigeria by placing the patient zero, Patrick Sawyer, in quarantine despite pressure from the Liberian government. The film had its theatrical release on 28 May 2021 and received mixed reviews from critics.

Cast 
 Omotola Jalade-Ekeinde
 Tony Umez
 Charles Awurum
 Sola Sobowale
 Ini Dima-Okojie
 Chioma Akpotha
 Jide Kene Achufusi
 Deyemi Okanlawon
 Nobert Young
 Emem Inwang
 Josh2Funny
 Melanie Oghene
 Chinonso Arubayi

Production 
The principal photography of the film was postponed due to the nationwide lockdown implemented in Nigeria during the first wave of the COVID-19 pandemic in March 2020. The film became the second batch of the Western African Film Fund with the collaboration of Sneeze Films, FilmOne, iFactory Films and CEM Media Group along with HuaHua Media and Empire Entertainment. The film was made based on the Ebola outbreak despite speculations emerged that the film was inspired based on the COVID-19 outbreak. Director, Inwang who was the brainchild of the story for the film revealed that he had begun conceiving the story in 2016 based on the Ebola virus outbreak in 2015. The film was predominantly shot in Lagos.

References 

2021 films
Nigerian thriller films
2021 psychological thriller films
English-language Nigerian films
Films shot in Lagos
2020s English-language films